The Prayer of Azariah and Song of the Three Holy Children, abbreviated Pr Azar, is a passage which appears after Daniel 3:23 in some translations of the Bible, including the ancient Greek Septuagint translation.

The passage is accepted by some Christian denominations as canonical.

The passage includes three main components. The first is the penitential prayer of Daniel's friend Azariah (called Abednego in Babylonian, according to ) while the three youths were in the fiery furnace. The second component is a brief account of a radiant figure who met them in the furnace yet who was unburned. The third component is the hymn of praise they sang when they realized their deliverance. The hymn includes the refrain, "Praise and exalt Him above all forever...", repeated many times, each naming a feature of the world.

Texts and origin

The Prayer and accompanying Song are not found in the Hebrew and Aramaic text of the Book of Daniel, nor are they cited in any extant early Jewish writings.

The origins of these writings are obscure. Whether the accounts were originally composed in Hebrew (or Aramaic) or in Greek is uncertain, although many modern scholars conclude on the basis of textual evidence that there was probably an original Semitic edition. The date of composition of these documents is also uncertain, although many scholars favor a date either in the second or first century B.C.

Canonicity 
It is accepted as canonical scripture by Catholic and Eastern Orthodox Christians, but rejected by Protestants.

Article VI of the Thirty-Nine Articles of the Church of England has it listed as non-canonical (but still, with the other Apocryphal texts, "the Church doth read for example of life and instruction of manners").

The passage is included in 80-book Protestant Bibles in the section of the Apocrypha.

See also 
 Nebuchadnezzar II
 Additions to Daniel

References

External links

 in the NAB
 in the NIV, a translation lacking this section, for comparison.
Text and commentary in the NETBIBLE

2nd-century BC books
1st-century BC books
Shadrach, Meshach, and Abednego
Canticles
Additions to Daniel